Defence and Security Equipment International (DSEI) is a biennial defence and security trade exhibition which serves as a forum between governments, national armed forces, industry, and academics, held at ExCeL London.

In 2019 DSEI had 1700 exhibitors from 58 countries. The event has active campaigns against it taking place, which has historically included attempts to disrupt the set-up of the event.

DSEI's history 

In 1999, the UK government decided to privatise the joint British Army and Royal Navy Exhibitions which had taken place since 1976. Exhibition company, Spearhead, launched DSEI (then known as Defence and Systems Equipment International) and the first event took place in Chertsey, Surrey.

In 2001, the exhibition was moved to its current location at the ExCeL Exhibition Centre in London Docklands. DSEI rebranded in 2009 to Defence and Security Equipment International.

Current ownership 
In April 2008, Clarion Events acquired DSEI

Controversy 
In 2011 the event threw out two exhibitors after they were found to be promoting cluster munitions that have been banned by the UK. Amnesty international has also reported the sale of banned instruments of torture at the event.

Criticism 

DSEI frequently attracts protests from those opposed to the sale of weapons in London or who are critical of the states that are allowed to attend and the equipment available for sale.

In 2019, Mayor of London Sadiq Khan criticised the event, saying "London is a global city, which is home to individuals who have fled conflict and suffered as a consequence of arms and weapons like those exhibited at DSEI. In order to represent Londoners’ interests, I will take any opportunity available to prevent this event from taking place at the Royal Docks in future years."

More than 100 protestors arrested for blockading the event in 2017. The supreme court since ruled that some of these protestors had "lawful excuse" as they were exercising their right to free speech and assembly.

Amnesty International have criticised the event for selling weapons of torture and for providing weapons that have been traced to attacks on civilians. In 2019 they made a spoof video highlighting the event and criticising its activities.

Campaign Against Arms Trade (CAAT) regularly campaigns against DSEI citing that many of the official military and security delegations that attend the exhibition represent human rights abusing regimes such as Egypt, the UAE, Bahrain and all countries on the UK governments own list of "countries of concern". One of these regimes that CAAT highlights are Saudi Arabia which has been one of the leading countries involved in the war in Yemen which CAAT states "has seen the deaths of thousands of civilians, and estimated arms sales to the coalition around £18 billion since the conflict began in 2015".

DSEI 2021 

DSEI 2021 was to occur from the 14–17 September 2021. It will offer an exhibition of Land, Aerospace, Naval, Joint, and Security capabilities, as well as an extensive keynote and seminar programme and will also see the debut of DSEI Connect, a virtual platform which has been created to give access to DSEI content and business development opportunities for those that aren’t able to attend in person. The protest group "Stop the Arms Fair" are organising a week of action in advance of the event to protest and obstruct its organisation. Sadiq Khan again criticised the event and asked for it not to take place in London, stating that his city was home to many people who had fled from other countries because of weapons like those on sale at DSEI.

DSEI Stakeholders 
Fully endorsed by the UK Ministry of Defence and the Department for International Trade, DSEI has a strong standing with the Royal Navy, the British Army and the Royal Air Force.

References

Trade fairs in the United Kingdom
Arms fairs
Military industry in the United Kingdom